Samtgemeinde Isenbüttel is a Samtgemeinde in the district of Gifhorn, in Lower Saxony, Germany. It is situated approximately 4 km southeast of Gifhorn. 15,502 citizens are living in the Samtgemeinde Meinersen.

Structure of the Samtgemeinde Isenbüttel
The Samtgemeinde is made up of the following village administrations Calberlah, Isenbüttel, Ribbesbüttel und Wasbüttel. The administration office is in Isenbüttel

References 

Samtgemeinden in Lower Saxony
Gifhorn (district)